Mukuzani ( muk’uzani) is a dry red Georgian wine made from Saperavi grapes in Mukuzani, Kakheti.  Mukuzani is distinct from the other wines made from the same grapes in that it is aged in oak casks for a longer time – at least three years.

Mukuzani has a deep red color with a soft smoky scent of oak and berry. The taste begins dry but the oak and fruit flavors quickly come through. As a result of its longer aging, Mukuzani has more complexity than the other wines made from Saperavi grapes. It goes particularly well with steaks and dark meats.

The matured wine contains 10.5–12.5% alcohol and has 6.0–7.0% titrated acidity.  It has been produced since 1888.

Mukuzani is considered by many to be the best of the Georgian red wines made from Saperavi. It has won 9 gold medals, 2 silver medals and 3 bronze medals in international competitions.

See also 
Georgian wine
Sweetness of wine
List of Georgian wine appellations

References

External links
"Mukuzani Red Wine," From the Cradle of Wine
"Hvino News" – daily wine news from Georgia in English, industry databases, documentation/laws, forum
Georgian Wine Catalogue with independent wine rating
"Teliani Valley," Georgian Winery
www.mukuzani.ge

Georgian wine
Georgian products with protected designation of origin